The word nahash means "serpent" in Hebrew. Nahash may refer to

 Serpents in the Bible
 Nahash of Ammon, a king mentioned in the first Book of Samuel.
 Another king of the Ammonites of the same name who showed kindness to David during his wanderings (2 Samuel 10:2) is also mentioned. On his death, David sent an embassy of sympathy to Hanun, Nahash's son and successor. 
 The father of Abigail, mother of Amasa, according to 2 Samuel 17:25.

See also
 Nahshon